The Auster J/5 Autocar was a late 1940s British single-engined four-seat high-wing touring monoplane built by Auster Aircraft Limited at Rearsby, Leicestershire.

Design and production
The company recognised a need for a four-seat touring aircraft to complement the three-seat Auster J/1 Autocrat. The J/5 Autocar looked similar to the Autocrat, but was a new model featuring wing-root fuel tanks and an enlarged cabin.

The designation of J/5 for the Autocar followed on from its progenitor, the wartime Model J, which was designated the Auster AOP.V by the Royal Air Force. Postwar models derived from the Model J commenced with the J/1 Autocrat - note the use of J/1, not J-1. 

The prototype Autocar G-AJYK, a model J/5B, first flew in August 1949 and was exhibited at the Farnborough Air Show in September. A demand for a more powerful version for the tropics produced in 1950 the J/5E powered by a 155 hp (116 kW) Blackburn Cirrus Major engine. This was further developed as the J/5G which was first flown in 1951 and is also referred to as the Cirrus Autocar. The later J/5P reverted to a more powerful de Havilland Gipsy Major engine. Other variants were built as one-off development aircraft, and some were converted in Australia with more mordern engines.

Operations
Saunders-Roe of Cowes, Isle of Wight, acquired a J/5G Autocar and fitted it with an experimental hydro-ski undercarriage and emergency under-wing floats. With this equipment, the aircraft could remain almost stationary on the water.

The majority of the production Autocars were exported to sixteen countries and later resold in five further territories. The Autocar has been primarily operated by private pilot owners and by aero clubs but some were used by small charter firms in the UK and elsewhere as taxi and photographic aircraft. Pest Control Ltd took delivery of five J/5G Autocars in 1952 for crop spraying operations in Sudan.

Variants

Auster J/5B Autocarproduction version with a 130 hp (97 kW) de Havilland Gipsy Major 1 engine.
Auster J/5E Autocarprototype export version with a Blackburn Cirrus Major 3 engine, one built (G-AJYS).
Auster J/5G Autocarexport version with a 155 hp Blackburn Cirrus Major 3 engine.
Auster J/5GLone Auster J/5G converted in Australia by Kingsford Smith Aviation Services (ZK-CXA, a rebuild of ZK-BDK) fitted with a Lycoming piston engine.
Auster J/5G Super AutocarOne J/5G converted in Australia by Kingsford Smith Aviation Services with a 225 hp (168 kW) Continental O-470 engine.
Auster J/5H Autocarwith 145 hp (108 kW) Blackburn Cirrus Major 2 engine, one rebuilt (VH-KCO) in Australia by Kingsford Smith Aviation Services from J/5B
Auster J/5P Autocarversion with a 145 hp (108 kW)de Havilland Gipsy Major 10 engine.
Auster J/5T Autocardevelopment aircraft with 185 hp (138 kW) Continental E-185-10 piston engine, one built (G-25-4, c/n 3421)
Auster J/5V Autocardevelopment aircraft with 160 hp (120 kW) Lycoming O-320 engine, one built (G-APUW)

Kingsford Smith Bushmaster
An Auster J/5G conversion in Australia by Kingsford Smith Aviation Services, fitted with a 180hp (134kW) Lycoming O-360 engine, constant speed propeller and other improvements.

Civil operators
United Kingdom
 Airviews Ltd
 Anglian Air Charter
 Bees Flight
 Bristol Aero Engines
 Dunlop Rubber
 Ferranti
 Gloster Aircraft
 Hunting Aerosurveys Ltd
 Pest Control Ltd
Saunders-Roe
 Southend Flying School

Military operators

Royal Australian Navy
723 Squadron RAN
724 Squadron RAN
725 Squadron RAN

Kuwait Air Force

Royal New Zealand Air Force

Specifications (J/5B)

References

Notes

Bibliography

External links

High-wing aircraft
Single-engined tractor aircraft
1940s British civil utility aircraft
Auster aircraft
Aircraft first flown in 1949